Chevening Halt is a now-closed intermediate railway station on the Westerham branch line in Kent.

The line was built as single track with provision for double track. The station was built by South Eastern and Chatham Railway (SECR) and opened on either 16 or 19 April 1906. It was unmanned and consisted of a platform sufficient to accommodate 2 coaches and small waiting shelter with access via a staircase to the adjacent road bridge. Operations were taken over by the Southern Railway with the 1923 railway grouping and thereafter by the Southern Region of British Railways which closed the line on 30 October 1961 ostensibly due to low patronage. The line was the subject of a revival/preservation attempt which was scuppered by plans for the M25 which called for the use of much of the route of the line.

The former station site is today a rough piece of overgrown scrubland bordering Junction 5 of the M25; this motorway is infamous as having been responsible for the dashing of any hopes of preserving the Westerham Branch. In 1964, Kent County Council had demanded from the Westerham Valley Railway Association, an association seeking to retain the railway for heritage operations, the sum of £26,215 (approximately £337,000 today) for a bridge to carry the railway line over the M25; failure to pay this sum would lead to the immediate in-filling of the Chevening cutting (in which the Halt lay), which is exactly what happened when funds could not be raised. According to one account, the halt platform was buried and remains there to this day.

Gallery

Other stations 

 Westerham
 Brasted
 Dunton Green

See also 

 List of closed railway stations in Britain

References

Sources
 

Disused railway stations in Kent
Former South Eastern Railway (UK) stations
Railway stations in Great Britain opened in 1906
Railway stations in Great Britain closed in 1961
1906 establishments in England
1961 disestablishments in England